Avipes (meaning "bird foot") is a genus of extinct archosaurs represented by the single species Avipes dillstedtianus, which lived during the middle Triassic period. The only known fossil specimen, a partial foot (metatarsals), was found in Bedheim, Thuringia, Germany, in deposits of Lettenkohlensandstein (a form of sandstone). Avipes was named in 1932 by Huene. Although originally classified as a coelurosaur or a ceratosaur, a new study of the fossil specimen found that it was too incomplete to assign to a group more specific than Archosauria, and so it was regarded as indeterminate by Rauhut and Hungerbuhler in 2000.

References

 Information on Avipes

Nomina dubia
Middle Triassic reptiles of Europe
Middle Triassic archosaurs
Prehistoric reptile genera